Mweshipandeka High School is a school in Ongwediva in the Oshana Region of northern Namibia. It is one of the well known schools in the country, and is located in the center of Ongwediva, in Libertina Amadhila street, next to Kleine Kuppe Private School and the International University of Management. The school was founded in 1984 and bears the name of King Mweshipandeka yaShaningika of the Oukwanyama. The aim for establishing the school was to limit the distance that was travelled by prospective students from nearby towns and villages to Odibo's St Mary's High School and Oshigambo High School which were very far for students that had to walk in the olden days.

Academics
The school offers junior and senior secondary education. The grades ranging from 8–12. It is one of the best performing school in Oshana region. It has a great track record of producing top students for and winning award in most of the High and Ordinary level subjects. Compared to other schools in Oshakati and Ongwediva, this school always send out many learners to all the universities in the country.

See also 
 Education in Namibia
 List of schools in Namibia

References

External links
 Mweshipandeka, the pride of the north School blog

Ongwediva
Schools in Oshana Region
1984 establishments in South West Africa